The Pakistan Squash Circuit is a series of professional squash tournaments played every year in Pakistan.

See also
 Squash in Pakistan

References

PSA World Tour
WSA World Tour
Squash tournaments in Pakistan
Women's squash tournaments